Morris Lyon Buchwalter (September 8, 1846 – March 12, 1924) was a radical Ohio Republican jurist of the post-Civil War era whose jurisprudence set a progressive standard following the failure of Reconstruction and during the rise in management/labor tensions in the Gilded Age.

Early life

Hon. Morris Lyon Buchwalter was born on September 8, 1846, and raised on the Buchwalter farmstead in Hallsville, Ross County, Ohio. He was the son of Levi and Margeret (née Lyon) Buchwalter, and the younger brother of Capt. Luther Morris Buchwalter and Capt. Edward Lyon Buchwalter, both Union Army officers of the American Civil War. Captain Luther Morris Buchwalter, an officer with the Ohio Volunteers, fell at the moonlit Wauhatchie skirmish during the third battle of Chickamauga. Capt. Edward L. Buchwalter (1841–1933) was an officer of the Ohio Volunteer Infantry and the 53rd Mississippi Colored Volunteers.  A veteran of the Gettysburg campaign, his brother Capt. Luther Morris Buchwalter was the impetus for the future Judge Buchwalter joining the Phi Kappa Psi Fraternity at Ohio Wesleyan University in 1864.  Buchwalter received his early education in the district schools of Ross county, then became a student of the Ohio Wesleyan University at Delaware, Ohio, and later changed his allegiance to Cornell University at Ithaca, New York, from which he received the degree of A.B. in 1869, being a member of the first class graduated from that institution.

Education to the Bar
In 1869, Morris L. Buchwalter transferred to the new Cornell University, where he became a founder of the New York Alpha chapter of Phi Kappa Psi. He was also the second President of the Irving Literary Society and roommate on Ithaca's Court Street with future Ohio Senator, Joseph Benson Foraker, who served with Morris's brother in the Tennessee campaign, which took the latter's life.  He was elected to Phi Beta Kappa Society, through the Cornell chapter.  Immediately after receiving his diploma, he moved to Cincinnati and entered the Cincinnati Law School, from which he graduated in 1870 with the degree of LL.B. He began general practice in the city and gained recognition as an energetic, reliable and progressive young lawyer who shirked no responsibility and spared no time or effort in sustaining any cause in which he was engaged.  His lifelong support for higher education peaked when he served as trustee for the University of Cincinnati, an institution for which he served in the same manner as his friends John Andrew Rea (as regent for the University of Washington), and Joseph B. Foraker(as trustee of Cornell University).  Morris was also the first President, Cornell Alumni Association and Class Secretary, Class of 1869, for many years.

The City of Cincinnati would eventually number Judge Buchwalter among its esteemed citizens, a man who possessed a high degree of confidence from the people of the city.  As the years passed, he gained a prominent position at the bar. On November 4, 1881, he was appointed by Governor Charles Foster, judge of the common-pleas court of the first judicial district of Ohio to fill a vacancy caused by the election of Judge Nicholas Longworth to the Supreme Court of Ohio. He, having been regularly elected for the full term in that court and subsequently reelected for a second and third term, and having also been endorsed by the vote of the bar of Hamilton county during three judicial elections, his judicial service ended February, 1897. Judge Buchwalter was thought to be a highly impartial jurist, and his decisions ranked among the clearest expositions of law enunciated from the common pleas bench in the 19th century.

This section incorporates text from the entry "Morris Lyon Buchwalter" in Cincinnati, the Queen City, 1788-1912, Volume 4, (S. J. Clarke Publishing Company, 1912) a publication now in the public domain.

Jurisprudence
An example of Buchwalter's labour jurisprudence is N. & C.G. Parker v. Bricklayers' Union No. 1. The action was brought by members of a contractors' union against a bricklayers' union and its various members and officers active in the controversy.  The issue at hand was the lawfulness of 'boycotting'.  Judge Buchwalter charged the jury that contractors:
may combine for the honest purpose of benefitting their order by encouraging favorable terms to their employers in the purchase of material, and to procure contracts for such contractors as employ members of their union; but they become engaged in illegal enterprise whenever they agree to accomplish their purpose by threats, intimidation, violence or like molestation, either toward the apprentice, the expelled member, the non-union workman, the contractor and the employer, the material man or the owner who proposes to make a contract."

In 1885, the Judge heard a case involving the menace of roller coasters:

Now that a "roller coaster" is ready to be launched upon the local public at Savin Rock, it is interesting to learn from the Boston Herald that Judge Buchwalter of Cincinnati, has been occupied an entire day with the hearing of testimony in a complaint case against one of them. Henry A. Morill and a number of other property owners and residents in the vicinity of the Bellevue house, in Cincinnati, are the plaintiffs, and David Billigheimer the defendant. The plaintiffs allege that the "roller coaster" or circular gravity railway, recently constructed on the Bellevue house grounds, is a nuisance to the neighborhood, on account of the noise it produces; that it prevents sleep, tortures invalids and nervous people, interrupts conversations, and will depreciate the value of property in that vicinity unless its further operation is enjoined, which the plaintiffs pray the court may be done by a perpetual injunction.

But it was in the area of civil liberties that Buchwalter stepped out in front of his peers.  In the extradition proceeding regarding the Reverend A. Hampton, an African-American accused of murder,  Buchwalter refused extradition to authorities from the Commonwealth of Kentucky until he had assurances from Governor Brown and the Sheriff of Green County, Kentucky, that Hampton would be protected from mob violence.   Vigilantes had recently lynched a black man and a black boy in Green County.  Buchwalter had also extradited two men, one to George and the other to Kentucky, only to receive reports that mobs killed both.  This was not solely due to Southern intolerance for African-Americans.  The Kentucky case involved an Italian-American.  Buchwalter's order from the bench included an admonishment against vigilante justice on the other side of the Ohio river: "I determined then I would never send another prisoner South unless I had assurance he would be protected from a mob and given a fair trial." It was thought for a while in 1895 that the position of Buchwalter would lead to an intrastate solution to the growing problem of lynching, forcing violent States such as Kentucky to use the good offices of States known for order and pacificity, such as Illinois and Pennsylvania. The trend did not abate, and the matter was taken up by the Federal government only in the 1960s.  The reaction in Cincinnati was more direct. A chapter of the Anti-Lynching League of the United States was formed in the Queen City in response to Buchwalter's opinion.

Personal life
On May 14, 1873, Buchwalter married Miss Louise Zimmerman, a daughter of the Honorable John Zimmerman, of Wooster, Ohio. Mrs. Buchwalter died in 1902, leaving six children, namely:  Luther L., who engaged in the manufacturing business at Springfield, Ohio;  Robert Z., an attorney of Cincinnati;  Margaret L., the wife of Dr. H. B. Martin, of Springfield; Helen E., the wife of John Van Nortwick, of Batavia, Illinois; Morris, who resided at Hallsville, Ohio; and Louise, who married H. Cameron Forster, of Middletown, Ohio.   On the 22d of July, 1909, the Judge married a second time, to Mary F. Knox, of Lakewood, New Jersey, formerly registrar of Smith College, a daughter of Rev. Charles E. Knox, deceased, formerly president of the German Theological Seminary, of Newark, New Jersey.

Politically, Buchwalter identified with the Republican Party, being a bridge figure between the abolition movement and the Progressive era.  He wrote an extensive study of Free Masonry and belonged to the Scottish Rite, being a thirty-third degree member of the order having been elected as such in 1894. He held membership in the Loyal Legion of Ohio, on account of his brother, Luther M., who was a captain in Company A, Seventy-Third Ohio Volunteer Infantry, and gave up his life for the Union at the midnight battle of Lookout Valley (Wauhatchie).  When he died, Morris was interred at Cincinnati's Spring Grove Cemetery, 69 paces from the grave of his fraternity brother, Senator Joseph Benson Foraker, both of whom graduated with Cornell University's first Class in 1869.

Buchwalter died on March 12, 1924, at the age of 78.

References 

1846 births
1924 deaths
People from Ross County, Ohio
Lawyers from Cincinnati
Ohio Wesleyan University alumni
University of Cincinnati College of Law alumni
Cornell University alumni
Judges of the Ohio District Courts of Appeals
19th-century American lawyers